Bugman may refer to:

Ruud Kleinpaste (born 1952), known as "the Bugman" in New Zealand, notably on Maggie's Garden Show from 1992
List of Donkey Kong characters (redirect from Stan the Bugman)
Bugman, villain in Teenage Mutant Ninja Turtles (1987 TV series)
Bugman, villain in COPS
"Bugman", a song from the 1999 Blur album 13
Bugman, a 2002 EP by the American band French Toast